
Gmina Zawichost is an urban-rural gmina (administrative district) in Sandomierz County, Świętokrzyskie Voivodeship, in south-central Poland.

Villages
Apart from the town of Zawichost, Gmina Zawichost contains the villages and settlements of Chrapanów, Czyżów Plebański, Czyżów Szlachecki, Dąbie, Dziurów, Józefków, Kolecin, Linów, Linów-Kolonia, Pawłów, Piotrowice, Podszyn, Wygoda and Wyspa.

Neighbouring gminas
Gmina Zawichost is bordered by the gminas of Annopol, Dwikozy, Ożarów and Radomyśl nad Sanem.

References

Polish official population figures 2006

Zawichost
Sandomierz County